The Croatian military ranks are the military insignia used by the Armed Forces of Croatia.

Commissioned officer ranks
The rank insignia of commissioned officers.

Abolished ranks

Other ranks
The rank insignia of non-commissioned officers and enlisted personnel.

See also
 Military ranks of the Independent State of Croatia
 Yugoslav People's Army ranks

References

External links